Streptomyces umbrinus is a bacterium species from the genus of Streptomyces which has been isolated from soil in Russia. Streptomyces umbrinus produces diumycins.

See also 
 List of Streptomyces species

References

Further reading

External links
Type strain of Streptomyces umbrinus at BacDive -  the Bacterial Diversity Metadatabase	

umbrinus
Bacteria described in 1958